Giovanni Luca Chiavari (Genoa, 1573 - Genoa, 1657) was the 98th Doge of the Republic of Genoa.

Biography 
The beginning of his two-year term as doge was aroused by a new war that again involved the Kingdom of France and the Spanish Empire for the succession of Duchy of Montferrat with a Republic of Genoa forced if not obliged to play a neutral role. Added to this were the new contrasts with the Duchy of Savoy of Charles Emmanuel I. His mandate ended on June 28, 1629. Chiavari died in 1657.

See also 

 Republic of Genoa
 Doge of Genoa

References 

17th-century Doges of Genoa
1572 births
1657 deaths